The TR MK class, later known as the EAR 25 class, was a class of  gauge  steam locomotives.  The eleven members of the class were built by Vulcan Foundry, in Newton-le-Willows, Lancashire (now part of Merseyside), England, for the Tanganyika Railway (TR).  They entered service on the TR in 1925–1926, and were later operated by the TR's successor, the East African Railways (EAR).

Class list
The builder's number, build year and fleet numbers of each member of the class were as follows:

See also
History of rail transport in Tanzania
Rail transport in Kenya
Rail transport in Uganda

References

Notes

Bibliography

External links

East African Railways locomotives
Metre gauge steam locomotives
Railway locomotives introduced in 1925
Steam locomotives of Kenya
Steam locomotives of Tanzania
Steam locomotives of Uganda
MK class
Vulcan Foundry locomotives
2-8-2 locomotives
Scrapped locomotives